In mathematics, the Milman–Pettis theorem states that every uniformly convex Banach space is reflexive.

The theorem was proved independently by D. Milman (1938) and B. J. Pettis (1939). S. Kakutani gave a different proof in 1939, and John R. Ringrose published a shorter proof in 1959.

Mahlon M. Day (1941) gave examples of reflexive Banach spaces which are not isomorphic to any uniformly convex space.

References 
 S. Kakutani, Weak topologies and regularity of Banach spaces, Proc. Imp. Acad. Tokyo 15 (1939), 169–173.
 D. Milman, On some criteria for the regularity of spaces of type (B), C. R. (Doklady) Acad. Sci. U.R.S.S, 20 (1938), 243–246.
 B. J. Pettis, A proof that every uniformly convex space is reflexive, Duke Math. J. 5 (1939), 249–253.
 J. R. Ringrose, A note on uniformly convex spaces, J. London Math. Soc. 34 (1959), 92.
 

Banach spaces
Theorems in functional analysis

fr:Théorème de Milman-Pettis